Pierre Dionis (1643 in Paris - 11 December 1718 in the same town) was a French surgeon and anatomist, First surgeon of the Enfants de France.

Biography
He was influenced by the work of Guichard Joseph Duverney (1648-1730).

Too busy with his duties, François Cureau de La Chambre appointed Pierre Cressé, to read the lectures, while Pierre Dionis performed the actual dissections.

He was appointed surgeon by Louis XIV in 1672 to teach at the  “anatomy according to the circulation of the blood”, while the Faculty of Medicine in Paris contested William Harvey's discovery of blood circulation. Louis XIV had sided with the Moderns of the Garden against the Ancients of the Faculty.

In 1688, he was first surgeon to Madame la Dauphine, then in 1709, first surgeon to Duchess of Burgundy.

His work, "L'anatomie de l'homme suivant la circulation du sang et les dernières découvertes" (The anatomy of man according to the circulation of the blood and the latest discoveries), 1690, was a prodigious success and was even translated into Tartar.

Works
  — Translated into several languages including Latin and the “Tartar language of Mantcheou, or Eastern Tartar, by order of the Emperor of China”. English translation: 1716
 
 . English translation: 1719
 . Translated into English in 1710 and into German in 1712. The first edition is from 1707.

Notes

References

17th-century French physicians
1643 births
1718 deaths
French surgeons
Deaths in Paris